Drunken Tiger was a Korean hip hop group that debuted in 1999 and has since released several albums and won numerous awards. They are known as pioneers of Korean hip-hop who helped bring the genre into the mainstream.

The group's original line-up consisted of central member Tiger JK, as well as DJ Shine. Micki Eyes, DJ Jhig, and Roscoe Umali later joined the group. In 2013, Tiger JK moved away from making music under the group's original name and formed MFBTY with his wife Yoon Mi-Rae and Bizzy. In 2018, Tiger JK released a final self titled album under the Drunken Tiger name, featuring Yoon Mi-Rae and Bizzy alongside a number of other artists.

History

1998-2000: Debut and early controversy

In 1998, Korean-American rappers Tiger JK and DJ Shine teamed up to form Drunken Tiger. They released their first album, Year of the Tiger in Korea in 1999. At the time, the album was controversial given its explicit lyrics and rejection of mainstream k-pop norms. Unlike their k-pop counterparts, Drunken Tiger wrote their own lyrics, expressed anti-establishment views, and did not perform choreography. However, the album's singles, "I Want You" and "Do You Know Hip-hop," are now considered Korean hip hop classics.

2000-2004: Drug charges and early success

In 2000, Drunken Tiger released their second album, The Great Rebirth, and introduced new members DJ Jhig, Micki Eyes, and Roscoe Umali. The album did well on music charts and established the group as "the first commercially successful true hip hop group" in Korea.

However, in the midst of the group's success, Tiger JK was arrested for using methamphetamine in Korea in 1999. Tiger JK said that, though he had used drugs in the past, he had not used them in Korea, and he said that he was ultimately found guilty due to false testimony from the members of the hip hop group Uptown, who has also been arrested on drug charges. Tiger JK spent a month and a half in jail and was sentenced to two years probation. As a result, Drunken Tiger was banned from performing on public media for two years. However, after appealing the decision, the ban was lifted, allowing the group to release their third album in 2001.

2001's The Legend Of..., is one of Drunken Tiger's most successful albums. Their single "Good Life" became a huge hit, topping Korean music charts for weeks. They went on to win Best Hip Hop Performance at the 2001 MNET Music Video Festival and the Hip-Hop/Rap Award at the 2001 Seoul Music Awards.

The group released the albums Foundation and One Is Not A Lonely Word in 2003 and 2004, respectively. By this point, Drunken Tiger's appeal had grown internationally, with the group gaining fans and performing in countries including Japan, China, and Taiwan.

2005-2012: Departure of DJ Shine and continued success

In 2005, during the debut of the group's sixth album, 1945 Liberation, founding member DJ Shine announced he would leave Drunken Tiger. Tiger JK continued using the group's name as a solo artist, and, with the success of the fifth album, signed endorsement deals with Hite Beer and Reebok. In 2006, Tiger JK established his own hip-hop label, Jungle Entertainment, which became the new home of Drunken Tiger.

The release of Drunken Tiger's seventh album, Sky Is The Limit, marked another high point in Drunken Tiger's career. Although Tiger JK's ability to perform was inhibited by his recently diagnosed acute transverse myelitis, the album's single "8:45 Heaven," a tribute to his late grandmother, became a fan favorite and won Best Hip Hop Song at the 2008 Korean Music Awards.

Drunken Tiger released its eighth album, Feel gHood Muzik, in 2009. The double-disc album featured American hip-hop legend, Rakim, as well as Roscoe Umali, who had not appeared on the last few Drunken Tiger releases. The album sold over 100,000 copies, and all 27 tracks debuted on the Top 100 K-Pop Singles chart. The album ultimately won Record of the Year at the 2010 Seoul Music Awards and Best Hip Hop Album at the 2010 Korean Music Awards.

2013-present: Forming MFBTY and Feel Ghood Music

In 2013, Tiger JK and label mates Yoon Mi-rae and Bizzy released the song, "Sweet Dream," under the group name MFBTY. An acronym for "My Fans [are] Better Than Yours," the name MFBTY started as a joke between Tiger JK and fans on Twitter. Although the name was meant to be temporary, the three artists have made subsequent releases as MFBTY, as well as under their solo names. 

Later that year, the three artists left Tiger JK's own Jungle Entertainment and signed to his new label, Feel Ghood Music. In September, they released the album The Cure, under the name Drunken Tiger ft. Yoon MiRae and Bizzy. The album, which peaked at #6 on the K-Pop Hot 100 chart, was a tribute to Tiger JK's father, who was battling cancer at the time.

In 2015, MFBTY released the album Wondaland, which was an immediate success. Hours after its release, 17 of the top 20 songs on Daum's music chart were from Wondaland. The album ultimately reached #8 on Billboard's World Albums chart. Tiger JK said the reason he wasn't making music under the name Drunken Tiger anymore was because his young son did not like the word "drunken." In 2018, Tiger JK released a final self titled album under the Drunken Tiger name, featuring Yoon Mi-Rae and Bizzy, as well as other artists including Dok2, Eun Ji-won, RM, and Junoflo.

Members
Tiger JK (Seo Jung-kwon) — 1998–2018
DJ Shine (Lim Byong-wook) — 1998–2005 
DJ Jhig (James Jung) — 2000–2003
Roscoe Umali — 2000–2002
Micki Eyes (Mike Amiri) — 2000–2002, 2018

Discography

Studio albums

Singles

Awards

Mnet Asian Music Awards

Seoul Music Awards

Golden Disk Awards

Korean Music Awards

Select live performances

External links
 Drunken Tiger official website 
 Drunken Tiger official website

References 

Jungle Entertainment artists
Musical groups established in 1992
South Korean hip hop groups
MAMA Award winners
Korean Music Award winners